The second HMS Manners (K568) was a British Captain-class frigate of the Royal Navy in commission during World War II. Originally constructed as the United States Navy Evarts-class destroyer escort DE-523, she served in the Royal Navy from 1943 to 1945.

Construction and transfer
The ship was laid down by the Boston Navy Yard in Boston, Massachusetts, on 14 August 1943 as the unnamed U.S. Navy destroyer escort DE-523 and launched on 24 September 1943. The ship was christened by Sara Fischer, the wife of Captain Hugo Fischer, who was the superintendent of the Boston Navy Yard at the time. The United States transferred the ship to the United Kingdom under Lend-Lease on 16 December 1943.

Service history
The ship was commissioned into service in the Royal Navy as HMS Manners (K568) on 16 December 1943 simultaneously with her transfer. She served on antisubmarine patrol and convoy escort duty in the North Atlantic Ocean.

On 26 October 1944, Manners accidentally rammed the Royal Norwegian Navy corvette  in the North Atlantic. As a result of damage suffered in the collision, Rose sank at position .

During the engagement, U-1051 fired an acoustic torpedo which exploded near Manners propellers, breaking her in two; her stern section sank, and four officers and 39 ratings were killed and 15 ratings were wounded. Aylmer, Bentinck, and Calder counterattacked, forcing U-1015 to the surface with depth charges and sinking her by ramming at position .

Manners forward section remained afloat and was towed to Barrow-in-Furness, England, where it arrived on 27 January 1945. Beyond economical repair, she was declared a constructive total loss, and the Royal Navy soon decommissioned her. The United Kingdom returned her to the U.S. Navy in England on 8 November 1945.

Disposal
The U.S. Navy struck Manners from its Naval Vessel Register on 19 December 1945. The United States sold her on 3 December 1946 for scrapping to the Athens Piraeus Electricity Company, Ltd., of Athens, Greece, for delivery to the company on 7 January 1947. She was scrapped in Piraeus, Greece, during 1947.

References

Navsource Online: Destroyer Escort Photo Archive DE-523 HMS Manners (K-568)
uboat.net HMS Manners (K 568)
http://www.telegraph.co.uk/news/obituaries/1568433/Captain-Denis-Jermain.html

 

Captain-class frigates
Evarts-class destroyer escorts
World War II frigates of the United Kingdom
World War II frigates and destroyer escorts of the United States
Ships built in Boston
1943 ships
Maritime incidents in January 1945